Proposed bans of LGBTQ-themed books in the United States.

1996

Florida
In September 1996, a local chapter of the national Parents, Families and Friends of Lesbians and Gays (PFLAG) created a display in the West Hernando/Staffordene T. Foggia branch library. The branch is part of the Hernando County Florida Library System.

Authors such as Alexander the Great, Gertrude Stein, and Walt Whitman were among the gay and lesbian authors that were included in the display. Books by the authors and red ribbons were displayed, along with a poster detailing the contributions of the authors to literature.

The community quickly responded. Hernando county offices and the library system received phone calls and letters. Responses were both positive and negative.

Assistant County Attorney Bill Buztrey informed county commissioners that removing the display could be considered a violation of the First Amendment to the United States Constitution. This would leave the county open to a lawsuit.

Laurel Solomon was the Library Services Director at that time. She issued a written statements that going forward, all displays would be "created and sponsored by the library itself... to promote library-related activities."

County commissioners stated that this would protect them from "the potential of nonsanctioned radical groups such as Nazis" from creating their own displays.

The Florida Library Association awarded Buztrey and two other county staff members with the Intellectual Freedom Award for invoking the First Amendment.

Many community members felt the library was de facto censorship. Local columnist Jan Gildewell wrote that the policy "indicates to me that reception of intellectual freedom awards is no guarantee of continued freedom--or intellect."

2005

Alabama
Republican lawmaker Gerald Allen proposed Alabama House Bill 30 (HB30), which would have banned public school libraries from purchasing books by gay authors or with gay characters. The bill did not become law.

Arkansas
A proposed ban in Arkansas would have barred any representation of gay and lesbian people in schools, libraries, and state-funded universities. It passed the state's lower house, but a tie vote in the state senate's Education Committee failed to bring it to the state senate floor.

Oklahoma
State Rep. Sally Kern, a Republican from Oklahoma City, supported House Resolution 1039, which would have required Oklahoma libraries to "confine homosexually themed books and other age-inappropriate material to areas exclusively for adult access and distribution." The bill also required that no public funds be used in "the distribution of such materials to children." The bill passed in the house but not the senate.

Books challenged for LGBTQ content 
Organized by year(s) challenged

2016 

 I Am Jazz, by Jessica Herthel and Jazz Jennings
 Beyond Magenta: Transgender Teens Speak Out, by Susan Kuklin 
 Fun Home, by Alison Bechdel
 Two Boys Kissing, by David Levithan
 This One Summer, written by Mariko Tamaki and illustrated by Jillian Tamaki
 Drama, written and illustrated by Raina Telgemeier

2015 

 I Am Jazz, by Jessica Herthel and Jazz Jennings
 Beyond Magenta: Transgender Teens Speak Out, by Susan Kuklin
 Two Boys Kissing, by David Levithan

2014 
 And Tango Makes Three, Justin Richardson and Peter Parnell
 The Perks of Being a Wallflower, by Stephen Chbosky

2013 
 The Perks of Being a Wallflower, by Stephen Chbosky

2012 
 The Kite Runner, by Khaled Hosseini
 And Tango Makes Three, by Peter Parnell and Justin Richardson

2010 
 And Tango Makes Three, by Peter Parnell and Justin Richardson
 Revolutionary Voices, edited by Amy Sonnie

2009 
 And Tango Makes Three, by Peter Parnell and Justin Richardson
 The Perks of Being a Wallflower, by Stephen Chbosky
 My Sister's Keeper, by Jodi Picoult

2008 
 And Tango Makes Three, by Justin Richardson and Peter Parnell
 The Perks of Being a Wallflower, by Stephen Chbosky
 Uncle Bobby's Wedding, by Sarah S. Brannen

See also

2020–22 book banning in the United States
Book censorship in the United States
List of books banned by governments
Homosexuality in children's literature
Lesbian teen fiction
Gay male teen fiction
List of LGBT characters in modern written fiction

References

Gay book bans
Book bans
LGBT-related lists